is a Japanese manga series written and illustrated by Masao Ōtake. It was serialized in Enterbrain's magazine Harta, formerly known as Fellows!, from June 2010 to July 2020. Its chapters were collected in 19 tankōbon volumes. The series is licensed by One Peace Books. An anime television series adaptation by Feel aired from April to June 2018. The story follows yakuza member Yoshifumi Nitta, who ends up taking care of a mysterious girl with telekinetic powers named Hina who inexplicably appeared in his apartment.

Plot
Yoshifumi Nitta, a mid-level Yakuza of the Ashikawa-gumi, finds his normal life thrown into chaos when a girl from the future literally drops on his head without warning. Knowing nothing more than her name, Hina, and the fact that she has incredible psychokinetic powers, Yoshifumi reluctantly becomes her de facto father. However, Hina's arrival sets off a chain reaction of events that affects everyone in the city, especially after more girls from the future arrive to bring her back or terminate her.

Characters

Main characters

 Hina is the titular heroine, possessing superhuman abilities such as telekinesis. Originally hailing from the future, she went back in time in a pod and landed on Nitta's head. Due to Hina threatening to break his furniture, Nitta reluctantly lets her stay. As he takes care of her, Nitta begins to feel more and more like a parent. Over the course of the plot, Nitta and Hina's relationship grow to the extent that they consider each other to be father and daughter - Nitta would welcome her into the Nitta family as his daughter, in front of his mother and sister. 
Nitta enrols Hina in school at her request, but she does not usually take it seriously, often sleeping in class. At home, she usually lazes around and plays video games. She is very particular about food, despite demonstrably lacking a refined palate; her favourite food is salmon roe. Although Nitta cares for her, Hina can annoy him to the extent that she gets kicked out of the apartment (temporarily). Nitta often compares her to the diligent Anzu, a fellow esper, and imagines being her father instead.

 Yoshifumi Nitta, mostly referred to by his surname Nitta, is the series protagonist. He is a member of the Ashikawa-gumi yakuza, later to become its lieutenant (kashira). One day, a portal opens from the future and drops Hina in a pod on his head; she threatens to break his furniture if he doesn't let her stay.
Nitta acquired cooking and housekeeping skills to take care of his mother and younger sister after his father died, and his hobby is collecting rare porcelain vases and urns (which Hina often destroys). Initially, Nitta presents Hina to his family as Hina Adachi, the daughter of an imprisoned fellow yakuza he is fostering. However, he decides to acknowledge her as his daughter after realising just how much their relationship has grown.

Supporting characters
 / 

 Anzu is another superhuman with telekinetic powers like Hina. She is initially sent to kill Hina, but loses to her in a contest of strength and abandons the mission. Unable to return to the future because the device necessary to do so was inadvertently damaged, she is taken in by Yassan, a homeless man. He invites her to join a homeless camp in Tokyo, where she learns the value of hard work and money.
When the camp is evicted from the park where they were staying, Anzu is adopted by a couple who run a Chinese restaurant, the Hayashis. She starts to adapt to a normal childhood; though retaining her values from her time with the camp. Anzu's conscientious and dutiful nature (a far cry from who she was when she first arrived in the present) often makes Nitta wish she were his daughter, instead of Hina.
Eventually, Anzu's parents decide to close down their restaurant, prompting Anzu to start up her own mobile ramen stand, which Nitta and Sabu frequent. When Hitomi visits the stall with her employees, one of them recognises her as his adopted younger sister. Later on in the series, Anzu bans Nitta from visiting the stall after a misunderstanding involving Sabu, although she later unbans him after Sabu apologizes.

 Hitomi is Hina's classmate in middle school, who has trouble saying no to helping people. When Hina asks her to tag along whilst she investigates what Nitta is getting up to, she's left all alone at Little Song. Mistaken for a bartender, Hitomi proves superb at tending bar, leading Utako to blackmail her into working at Little Song. Through a series of coincidences, she is taken for an adult, and starts working at more and more jobs whilst trying (and failing) to be a normal student. She also accumulates connections to influential businesspeople, politicians, and yakuza. Hitomi climbs the ranks so fast at one company, that she ends up President - hiring her father under her adult guise when he is laid off from his job. Later on, she resigns from her job to escape the corporate world and moves to Florida, but somehow ends up CEO at an even bigger company.
Hitomi, at least in the beginning, is a milquetoast; generally bending over backwards for anything that is asked of her. However, as the series progresses and she acquires influence, Hitomi becomes more willing and able to use her connections against those who earn her scorn. When the cast learns about the bad future they need to avert, for example, Nitta is shown not caring at all - not even when Hitomi returns to Japan specifically to seek his aid in regards to that. As a result, she manipulates things so that all of Nitta's businesses go under, and, as a final nail in the coffin, nearly alienates Anzu from him, causing him to give in and start calling her "my liege".

 The owner and original bartender of the bar Little Song. She blackmails Hitomi into working for her after Hitomi becomes highly skilled at bartending, but is soon made redundant in her own bar as her customers come to prefer Hitomi's drinks. Nitta was romantically interested in Utako, but she rejects him because she believes him to be a divorced single father, and Nitta later loses interest in her due to her self-centred personality. Despite this, she is shown to have another side to her; protesting on behalf of and serving soup to the ward's homeless on the verge of eviction, and arranging for Anzu to be taken in by the Hayashis.

Another esper with telekinetic powers from the same organization as Hina and Anzu. After being sent to recover them both, she accidentally lands on a deserted island and is stuck there for months without human contact, creating wooden puppet versions of Hina and Anzu to keep from going insane. Eventually, she manages to build a raft and ends up in China, where she studies kung-fu while subtly using her powers to rise near the top of the school. After a few years of training, she returns to Japan after being tasked to establish a branch of the school there, which leads to the establishment of a fitness instruction class called "Superhuman Fitness".

The former head of Ashikawa-gumi. He eventually retires from his position due his advanced age and poor health, but maintains much of his influence. He dotes on Hina in a grandfatherly way, even using yakuza resources to assist her in such situations as running for student council president, and encourages Nitta to take a more active interest in raising her.

The second-in-command of Nitta's yakuza group. He views Nitta as a shameless brown-noser, but respects his recent accomplishments. He succeeded Yoshishiko as the new head of the yakuza group.

Nitta's underling in his yakuza group. He usually proves somewhat inept at whatever task he is assigned, such as debt collection, forcing Nitta to handle matters personally.

Nitta's former mentor and the estranged father of Hitoshi. Known to be quick-tempered, demanding, and violent, he gave Nitta the scar above his eye. He spent several years in prison and is released in the months after Nitta starts taking care of Hina.

A boy who attends the same middle school as Hina, and later on develop feelings for her. Hina helps him work up the courage to confront his absentee father, Naitou.

One of Hina's classmates, and one of the few people who becomes aware of Hina's powers. She is obsessed with the paranormal and as such tends to gravitate towards Hina and also tends to jump to weird conclusions and overall acts like a younger kid than she is. She is also a loner in high school.

One of Hina's classmates. She helps in the investigation to discover Hitomi's secret job. She tends to be very serious, although she also plays around for fun. She is also noticeably smarter than her classmates, and her defining trait is her glasses.

Yassan is the homeless man who takes Anzu in after she fails to return to her home time. He teaches her the value of hard work and money, and becomes a father figure to her. After the ward administration evicted them from the park they were staying in, he brokered a deal through Utako for the Hayashis to take her in as their daughter. Yassan meets Anzu again after the time-skip, getting a bowl of ramen from her cart.

The lead guitarist and vocalist of the band Central Park. Initially struggling to gain popularity, the band gains after coming into contact with Hina, who uses her powers to allow Atsushi to float during performances, a feeling he terms "Rocksion". After Hina ceases working with the band, their popularity falls again, leading Atsushi on a quest to gain magic powers and obtain "Rocksion". He later starts collaborating with Mao in the Superhuman Fitness project. In the previous timeline, his starts the project that led to the creation of the superhumans and is referred to as "Master", but is detained after the superhumans go out of control.

Media

Manga
Hinamatsuri is written and illustrated by Masao Ōtake. It was serialized in Enterbrain's magazine Harta, formerly known as Fellows!, from June 15, 2010 to July 15, 2020. Its chapters were collected in nineteen tankōbon volumes. English manga publisher One Peace Books has licensed the series for publication in North America.

Anime
A 12-episode anime television series adaptation by Feel aired from April 6 to June 22, 2018. The series is directed by Kei Oikawa with Keiichirō Ōchi writing the scripts and Nippon Columbia producing the music. Rie Murakawa performed the opening theme song "Distance", while Yoshiki Nakajima performed the ending theme  as his character Yoshifumi Nitta. Crunchyroll simulcast the anime, while Funimation streamed an English dub.

Episode list

Reception
Hinamatsuri was nominated for the 52nd Seiun Awards in the Best Comic category in 2021.

Notes

References

External links
 
 
  

Comedy anime and manga
Crunchyroll anime
Enterbrain manga
Kadokawa Dwango franchises
Feel (animation studio)
Funimation
Kadokawa Shoten manga
Seinen manga
Yakuza in anime and manga